Dave or David Jackson may refer to:

Academics
David Jackson (art historian) (born 1958), British professor of Russian and Scandinavian art histories
David J. Jackson, American political science professor
David M. Jackson, Canadian mathematics professor

Arts and entertainment
David Noyes Jackson (1922–2001), American writer, collaborator of James Merrill
David Jackson (actor) (1934–2005), British actor
David Jackson (rock musician) (born 1947), English musician and former member of the band Van der Graaf Generator
David Jackson (director) (active since 1983), American television director and writer
David Jackson (comics), American comic-book letterer and artist of Warrior

Politics and law
David S. Jackson (1813–1872), American politician, U.S. Representative from New York
David Jackson (Manitoba politician) (1852–1925), Canadian politician in Manitoba
David Jackson (Australian politician) (1889–1941), member of the Australian House of Representatives
David Francis Jackson (fl. 1985–1987), Australian jurist on List of judges of the Federal Court of Australia
David Jackson (judge), Australian jurist, judge in the Supreme Court of Queensland
David D. Jackson (born 1946), Kansas state legislator

Sports

Boxing
David Jackson (Ugandan boxer) (born 1949), Ugandan boxer
David Jackson (New Zealand boxer) (1955–2004), New Zealand boxer
David Jackson (American boxer) (born 1976), American Olympic boxer

Other sports
David Jackson (footballer, born 1937), English footballer
David Jackson (cricketer) (born 1953), English cricketer
David Jackson (footballer, born 1958), English footballer
David Jackson (golfer) (born 1964), American professional golfer
Dave Jackson (ice hockey) (born c. 1964), Canadian National Hockey League referee
David Jackson (basketball, born 1982), American basketball player in Novo Basquete Brasil and Liga Sudamericana de Básquetbol
Paddy Jackson (David Patrick Lindsay James Jackson, born 1992), Irish rugby player

Others
David Jackson (delegate) (1747–1801), American physician, delegate to Continental Congress for Pennsylvania
David Edward Jackson (1788–1837), American explorer, frontiersman, and trapper
D. Hamilton Jackson (1884–1946), civil rights leader, resident of the United States Virgin Islands
Dave Jackson (Maine game warden) (1902–1978), American game warden, Allagash Wilderness Waterway guide
Oliver David Jackson (1919–2004), Australian Army officer
David Jackson (Seeking Alpha), American entrepreneur, founder of Seeking Alpha in 2004